Franz Alt (1821–1914) was an Austrian landscape painter, son of Jakob Alt and the younger brother of Rudolf von Alt. His work is included in the collection of the Metropolitan Museum of Art, the Cooper Hewitt Museum (Smithsonian), the Albertina Museum, the Museum of Fine Arts, Budapest and other international collections.

References

1821 births
1914 deaths
19th-century Austrian painters
19th-century Austrian male artists
Austrian male painters
20th-century Austrian painters
20th-century Austrian male artists
Austrian landscape painters
Place of birth missing